The Soviet–Polish Non-Aggression Pact (transliterated as ) was a non-aggression pact signed in 1932 by representatives of Poland and the Soviet Union. The pact was unilaterally broken by the Soviet Union on September 17, 1939, during the Soviet invasion of Poland.

Background
After the Polish–Soviet War, the Polish authorities pursued a policy of "equal distance" between Germany and the Soviet Union. Most Polish politicians, both on the left and on the right, believed that Poland should rely mostly on the crucial Franco-Polish Military Alliance, which dated back to World War I, and not support either Germany or the Soviet Union.

To normalise bilateral contacts with the Soviet Union, talks were started in January 1926 to prepare a non-aggression pact to fortify the Polish gains of the Peace of Riga that was to be balanced by a similar pact signed with Germany. However, the talks with Germany were not started, and the Polish–Soviet talks were interrupted in June 1927, when Britain broke off diplomatic relations with the Soviet Union and Soviet plenipotentiary Pyotr Voykov was killed in Warsaw. Instead, Poland applied to the Briand-Kellogg Pact of 1928.

Polish-Soviet negotiations were resumed in Moscow in 1931. The pact was signed on July 25, 1932, effective for three years. Ratifications were exchanged in Warsaw on December 23, 1932, and the pact went into effect on the same day. It was registered in League of Nations Treaty Series on January 9, 1933.

On May 5, 1934, it was extended to December 31, 1945 without amendment.

Terms
Both sides agreed to renounce violence in bilateral relations, to resolve their problems through negotiations and to forgo any armed conflict or alliances aimed at the other side.

Aftermath
On September 23, 1938, the Soviet Union sent a note to the Polish government to inform it that the pact would be considered null and void if Poland participated in the occupation of Czechoslovakia . However, the threat was not carried out since the Soviet government stated on October 31, after Poland had occupied Zaolzie area, that the pact remained in force , and the pact was reaffirmed by the two powers on November 26, 1938 (see ). It was finally broken by the Soviets on September 17, 1939, when the Soviet and German jointly invaded Poland, in accordance with the secret protocols of the Molotov–Ribbentrop Pact.

The pact was considered at the time as a major success of Polish diplomacy, which had been greatly weakened by the toll war with Germany, the renouncement of parts of the Treaty of Versailles and the loosened ties to France. The pact also reinforced the Polish negotiating position with Germany, which finally resulted in the signing of the German–Polish declaration of non-aggression 18 months later.

See also 
 Soviet–Finnish Non-Aggression Pact
 Franco-Soviet Treaty of Mutual Assistance
 German–Polish declaration of non-aggression
 Soviet–Japanese Neutrality Pact
 Budapest Memorandum on Security Assurances

References

Sources

External links
 Text of Soviet-Polish Non-Aggression Pact

1932 in Poland
1932 in the Soviet Union
Treaties of the Soviet Union
World War II treaties
Poland–Soviet Union relations
Treaties concluded in 1932
Treaties of the Second Polish Republic
Interwar-period treaties
Non-aggression pacts